Feel the Fear is a television programme for 7 to 12 year-olds broadcast on CITV in the United Kingdom. The show centres on the two presenters, Holly Willoughby and Steve Wilson, setting each other challenges to test their nerve. It uses common phobias, such as the fear of heights and the dark, as the basis. It was produced by Darrall Macqueen.

Show Format 
The shows are broadcast alternately: one week Holly will set Steve a fear to face and the next week Steve will present a challenge to Holly. The 'boys v girls' idea is a sub-theme of the programme. Whoever is facing their fear completes three challenges over two days, two on day one and another on day two. These increase in difficulty as they progress, and the final challenge really determines whether the fear has been overcome or not.

Other Features 
During the challenges a phobia expert, Anjula Mutanda, monitors the heartbeat of the contestant in order to find out whether they are 'feeling the fear'. There is also a 'body burst' section, in which Anjula explains, with the aid of an animated sequence, the science behind the fears and the body's reactions to these.

Episode list
Below is a list of the episodes broadcast, in transmission order.

Holly vs Flying
Steve vs Stings
Holly vs Rollercoasters
Steve vs Sharks
Holly vs Snakes
Steve vs The Dark
Holly vs Stage Fright
Steve vs Spiders
Holly vs The Deep
Steve vs Bulls
Holly vs Rats
Steve vs Heights
Boys vs Girls

Broadcast Details 

November 2005 onwards

Day: Mondays
Time: 4:30pm–5:00pm
Channel: ITV Network (CITV)

January 2006 onwards

Day: Mondays
Time: 4:00pm–4:30pm
Channel: ITV Network (CITV)

April 2006 onwards

Day: Sundays
Time: 10:30am–11:00am
Channel: CITV

October 2006 half term

Day: Weekdays
Time: 11:00am–10:30am
Channel: CITV

February 2007 and onwards
Day: Weekends
Time: 5:30-6:00
Channel: CITV

January 2008 and onwards
Day: Weekdays
Time: 5:30 -6:00
Channel: CITV

External links 
Official website
Feel the Fear at itv.com/citv

ITV children's television shows
2000s British children's television series